In Alabama, Interstate 20 (I-20) travels  through the center of the state. It enters the state from Mississippi near Cuba, and travels northeastward through Tuscaloosa and Birmingham. At Birmingham, I-20 turns eastward and heads through Oxford before crossing the Georgia state line near Lebanon. Other cities on the route include Livingston, Bessemer, and Pell City.

Mileage and exits on the concurrency are I-59's, although both highways have the same mileage for the Alabama concurrency.

Route description

Western Alabama
After I-20/I-59 enters Alabama from Mississippi, they travel concurrently northeastward across the Tombigbee River and Black Warrior River delta country which is generally low-lying farmland until reaching Tuscaloosa. This area contains low population. U.S. Route 11 (US 11) parallels this route from Mississippi northeastward while it passes through small towns like York, Livingston, and Eutaw before reaching Tuscaloosa.

At Tuscaloosa, the highway connects with I-359 which travels northward into downtown Tuscaloosa and to the University of Alabama.

From the Mississippi–Alabama state line to Tuscaloosa, I-20/I-59 is a four-lane route. While passing Tuscaloosa, the route briefly becomes six lanes but once again becomes four lanes east of exit 73. The stretch between McFarland Boulevard and Skyland Blvd (exit 76) is currently being widened to six lanes.

From Tuscaloosa to Birmingham, the highway continues on an east-northeast heading traveling through rolling forested terrain until reaching I-459 southwest of Bessemer. Most of this stretch is now a six-lane freeway and construction continues to widen the highway just northeast of Tuscaloosa to six-lane capacity. This stretch also hosts the Mercedes auto plant which is a large employer of residents primarily from Jefferson, Tuscaloosa, and Bibb counties. I-459 travels east and then northeast around the southern periphery of the Birmingham area before reconnecting first with I-20 near Irondale and then terminating at I-59 near Trussville. I-422 (Birmingham Northern Beltline) is slated to connect to I-20/I-59 at the I-459 interchange; however, this project is still years away from completion.

Birmingham
After passing the I-459 interchange, the highway continues northeast through the Birmingham suburbs of Bessemer, Fairfield, and Hueytown, and entering Birmingham near the Ensley community. The highway continues east-northeast through downtown before reaching the Birmingham–Shuttlesworth International Airport where I-59 continues northeast toward Gadsden and I-20 turns eastward toward Atlanta. Most of this stretch is through urban areas including passing near the U.S. Steel plant near Fairfield, and visible from the Interstate looking north and northwest are several smokestacks which is all that remain of several large steel mills that used to dominate the Ensley community of Birmingham.

As I-20/I-59 travels eastward just past the Arkadelphia Road exit in the East Thomas community, the highway rises to the top of East Thomas hill, giving eastbound travelers an excellent view of the downtown Birmingham skyline just before reaching the interchange with I-65.

As I-20/I-59 leaves the downtown area, the highway has an interchange with the Elton B. Stephens Expressway, also known locally as the Red Mountain Expressway, which travels south across the downtown area and into the southern Birmingham suburbs.

Once I-20 turns away from I-59, it begins an eastbound journey toward Georgia. The first  are a four-lane bridge of east Birmingham neighborhoods before reaching the shopping areas formerly known as Eastwood Mall and Century Plaza.

I-20 is a six-lane freeway from exit 132 to exit 162. This highway travels through rolling suburban country and crosses I-459 near Irondale.

As of 2017, preparation is underway to temporarily close I-20/I-59 east of I-65 in order to rebuild the overpass between 17th Street and US 31/US 280. The current bridge was completed when this segment of the highway opened in 1973. It is expected that this segment of the highway will close in the fall of 2018. Demolition of the existing bridge and erecting the new bridge is expected to take up to 14 months, meaning that it should reopen in late 2019.

"Bloody 20"
The section of I-20 between Leeds and Pell City is one of the most dangerous stretches of Interstate Highway in Alabama. The terrain is significantly hilly as the route passing across the northeast to southwest ridges of the Appalachian Mountains. There are two significant uphill grades in each direction which slows down truck traffic. However, due to the heavy volume of truck traffic combined with speeding car traffic, accidents are frequent and sometimes deadly. This part of I-20 is sometimes called "Bloody 20". Between 2010 and 2014, work was completed to add one additional lane in each direction along I-20.

Eastern Alabama
East of milemarker 155, the highway once again becomes six lanes until reaching the Coosa River bridge near Riverside. This bridge was scheduled to be replaced when the stretch between the Coosa River and milemarker 172 is widened to six lanes from four lanes. However, no timetable for this project has been announced. Exits 165 and 168 serve the Honda Motor Company which has a plant at Lincoln. Exits 168 and 173 serve the Talladega Superspeedway which hosts two NASCAR racing weeks each year. The terrain east of milemarker 155 until reaching milemarker 191 is the relatively flat Coosa River valley.

East of milemarker 172 until milemarker 188, the route is once again six lanes. From exit 188 to exit 205, I-20 narrows again to four lanes. East of exit 205, I-20 becomes a six-lane route until it reaches exit 210. However, in this area, construction is ongoing to widen the last  to six lanes to the Georgia state line. I-20 dives into Oxford from the west into its interchange with Alabama State Route 21 (SR 21). Here, you can see Quintard Mall and some of the highest mountains in Alabama, including Cheaha Mountain. The Anniston–Oxford metropolitan area is served by exits 179, 185, 188, and 191. 

Truck traffic is significantly slowed by this hill, causing occasional traffic backups.

This stretch of Interstate contains multiple parclo Interchanges.

East of Birmingham, US 78 serves as the parallel U.S. Route.

History
The completion of I-20 in Alabama was done in numerous stages. Few segments were completed in such a way that they had interchanges with existing segments. The first section to be opened was a  segment between Leeds and Riverside in the early 1960s. The next section to open was a  segment between the Tuscaloosa and the Tuscaloosa–Jefferson county line in the mid-1960s.

The next section of I-20 to open in Alabama was a  stretch between Avenue I in Ensley and Arkadelphia Road (US 78/SR 5) near Birmingham–Southern College. This was the first segment of Interstate Highway to open in Birmingham. This segment, as well as a  segment from the Mississippi state line to what is now exit 1, leading to Cuba opened in the late 1960s.

The early 1970s saw more sections of I-20 completed in Alabama, including a  segment between Epes and Tuscaloosa, a  segment between Fairfield and Ensley, a  segment between US 78 and I-65, a  segment between US 78 in Riverside and SR 77 in Lincoln, then an additional  leading to SR 21 at Oxford.

During the mid-1970s, I-20 was extended further east in Birmingham. The first segment to open east of I-65 was a short segment leading to 17th Street in downtown, then another segment that extended the route to 22nd Street near the Birmingham–Jefferson Civic Center. The opening of additional segments continuing eastward led to temporary ends of I-20 at SR 79 (Tallapoosa Street) near Birmingham–Shuttlesworth International Airport, then at US 78 in Irondale. Also, the segment of the highway between Bessemer and Fairfield was completed. In the eastern part of the state, I-20 was extended east from Oxford to SR 9 near Heflin.

During the late 1970s, I-20 was completed in east Alabama; however, only  of the highway was opened since it was not complete in Georgia. The segment between the Georgia state line and Douglasville was among the final segments of Interstate Highway to be completed in Georgia. The temporary end of I-20 in Alabama was at SR 46. Also, the final section of I-20 connecting Tuscaloosa and Birmingham was completed, as the section of US 11 between the Tuscaloosa–Jefferson county line and Bessemer was upgraded from an expressway to a limited-access highway.

In the early 1980s, segments connecting Cuba and Livingston and then Livingston and Epes completed I-20 between the Mississippi state line and Birmingham. The final segment of the route to be completed was an  section between Irondale and Leeds. This segment opened in 1985.

I-20 has no three-digit spur routes in Alabama, although at one time there was discussion of a spur northward from Oxford into Anniston which would also serve as a connection to the US Army base at Fort McClellan as well as to Gadsden. The closing of the base as well as a lack of population between Anniston and Gadsden eliminated the necessity of such a route. I-459 south of Birmingham connects to I-20 east and west of the city, continuing to I-59 northeast of the routes' split.

On January 21, 2019, along the concurrency with I-59, a segment of the Interstate, as well as an interchange with I-65 locally known as "Malfunction Junction" was closed for demolition; it will be converted to a redesigned stack interchange with right-side exits.

Exit list

See also

References

External links

 SouthEastRoads-Interstate 20
 SouthEastRoads-Interstates 20 East/59 North
 SouthEastRoads-Interstates 20 West/59 South

20
 Alabama
Transportation in Sumter County, Alabama
Transportation in Greene County, Alabama
Transportation in Tuscaloosa County, Alabama
Transportation in Jefferson County, Alabama
Transportation in St. Clair County, Alabama
Transportation in Talladega County, Alabama
Transportation in Calhoun County, Alabama
Transportation in Cleburne County, Alabama
Transportation in Tuscaloosa, Alabama
Bessemer, Alabama
Transportation in Birmingham, Alabama
Oxford, Alabama
Anniston, Alabama